Lokomotiv Stadium is a bandy arena in Smidovich, Russia. It was the home arena of bandy club Urozhay, which was playing in the second-tier Russian Bandy Supreme League until 2015-16.

References

Bandy venues in Russia
Sport in the Jewish Autonomous Oblast
Buildings and structures in the Jewish Autonomous Oblast